Legot is a French language surname, of Luxembourgian and Belgian origins. It may refer to:
Marguerite Legot (1913–977), Belgian minister of State
Pablo Legot (1598–1671), Spanish painter, who was born in Luxembourg

French-language surnames
Surnames of Luxembourgian origin
Surnames of Belgian origin